Gilbert Town Historic District is an archaeological site listed in the National Register of Historic Places located in Rutherfordton, Rutherford County, North Carolina.  From 1776 to 1783, Gilbert Town was an important trading center and served as a camp for both Patriot and Loyalist forces during the American Revolutionary War. Gilbert Town included the William Gilbert House, a store, tavern, mill, and blacksmith shop. Gilbert Town was also the site of the Rutherford County Courthouse from 1781 to 1783. The sites are located along the approximate location of Rock Road on the Overmountain Victory National Historic Trail.

It was added to the National Register of Historic Places in February 2006.

To learn more about the Gilbert Town Historic District visit: History's Hidden Landscapes: Gilbert Town Historic District

References

Archaeological sites on the National Register of Historic Places in North Carolina
Historic districts on the National Register of Historic Places in North Carolina
Buildings and structures in Rutherford County, North Carolina
National Register of Historic Places in Rutherford County, North Carolina
Rutherfordton, North Carolina